Burks is a surname. Notable people with the name include:

Alec Burks (born 1991), American basketball player who plays shooting guard and currently plays for the Utah Jazz in the NBA
Antonio Burks (basketball, born 1980) (born 1980), American basketball player who plays point guard and has played in the NBA
Antonio Burks (basketball, born 1982), American basketball player who plays guard-forward and has played in the ABA
Arthur Burks (1915-2008), American mathematician and computer scientist who worked on the ENIAC
Barbara Stoddard Burks (1902–1943), American psychologist
Charlotte Burks (born 1942), American politician
Edward C. Burks (1821-1897), an associate justice of the Supreme Court of Virginia
Ellis Burks (born 1964), American baseball player 
Gregory Burks (born 1980), American former professional basketball player
Jewel Burks, American tech entrepreneur and venture capitalist
Marion E. Burks (1912-1989), American judge and politician
Martin P. Burks (1851-1928), an associate justice of the Supreme Court of Virginia
Mary Fair Burks (1920–1991), American educator, scholar, and civil rights activist
Mary Ivy Burks (1920-2007), American activist
Michael Burks (1957–2012), American blues guitarist, singer and songwriter
Oren Burks (born 1995), American football player
Robert Burks (1909–1968), American cinematographer
Ruth Coker Burks (born 1959), American HIV activist
Tommy Burks (1940–1998), American politician
Treylon Burks (born 2000), American football player

See also
Burkes, surname
Burke (surname)
Burk (name), given name and surname
Berks (disambiguation), includes people with surname Berks
Birks (surname)

English-language surnames